Surfer's myelopathy is a rare nontraumatic injury causing paraplegia which is paralysis below the waist. It is a spinal cord injury caused by hyperextension of the back. When the back is hyperextended, a blood vessel leading to the spine can become kinked, depriving the spinal cord of oxygen The first reported case of a patient with surfer's myelopathy undergoing acute spinal angiography revealed anterior spinal artery compromise. The condition gets its name because the phenomenon is most often seen in those surfing for the first time, but it can be caused by any activity in which the back is hyperextended (yoga, pilates, etc.). In some cases the paralysis is permanent.

Prevention 
According to DPT Sergio Florian, some recommendations for preventing myelopathy is proper warm up, limiting the session length and sitting on the board while waiting for waves, rather than lying.

History 
A case series of 19 novice surfers with nontraumatic myelopathy was published in 2012, with all patients' MRI scans showing hyperintensity from the lower thoracic spinal cord to the conus medullaris. An additional study of 23 cases was published in 2013.

See also

References

Further reading

Neurological disorders
Rare diseases
Surfing